Polyamine oxidase (propane-1,3-diamine-forming) (MPAO, maize PAO) is an enzyme with systematic name spermidine:oxygen oxidoreductase (propane-1,3-diamine-forming). This enzyme catalyses the following chemical reaction

 spermidine + O2 + H2O  propane-1,3-diamine + 4-aminobutanal + H2O2

The products of the reaction cannot be converted directly to other polyamines.

References

External links 
 

EC 1.5.3